The fourth season of Australia's Next Top Model premiered on 22 April 2008 on Fox8. Auditions were held during October and November 2007 across Australia. Host Jodhi Meares returned for the fourth series along with judges Alex Perry and Charlotte Dawson, while Jez Smith left the show due to scheduling commitments. Two different guest judges were included at panel every week. The contestants were housed in an $8 million waterfront mansion, located in the southern Sydney suburb of Port Hacking, which the contestants moved into on 25 January 2008.

The prizes for this season included a one-year modelling contract with Priscilla's Model Management in Sydney, an all expenses paid trip to New York City to meet with top international agencies, a Ford Fiesta Zetec, a one-year contract to be the face of Napoleon Perdis Cosmetics, and an eight-page fashion spread in Vogue Australia.

The winner of the competition was 16-year-old Demelza Reveley from Wollongong, New South Wales.

Cast

Contestants
(Ages stated are at start of contest)

Judges
 Jodhi Meares
 Charlotte Dawson
 Alex Perry

Other cast members
Jonathan Pease – style director, model mentor

Episodes

Results

 The contestant was immune from elimination.
 The contestant was eliminated.
 The contestant won the competition.

Final votes

Controversy
This series created some controversy in regards to in-house bullying. The fourth episode, "Reality Bites", showed contestant Alamela Rowan being taunted by Demelza Reveley, Rebecca Jobson and Alyce Crawford, with Reveley and Jobson in particular causing Rowan to become visibly upset.  During the episode, Reveley proceeded to pour and throw water balloons at Rowan in a bid to get her to "open up" because she "just didn't get her". Another contestant, Alexandra Girdwood said in the episode that ironically, Reveley had changed schools several times because she herself had been a victim of bullying.

Reveley, Crawford, and Jobson were christened the "Dapto Dogs" by judge Charlotte Dawson during the judging following the incident. Belinda Hodge, who was the contestant eliminated that episode, had defended Rowan on several occasions and was later praised by numerous media outlets for not "jumping the bandwagon" and bullying Rowan. After the episode aired there was an immediate media backlash in regard to the limited response toward the contestants involved in the bullying. It was stated by leading Australian Psychologist Michael Carr Gregg that the show did not properly handle the behavior of Reveley and the other contestants. It was also alleged that Fox8 downplayed the events with reports that in addition to what was televised, Reveley put condoms filled with mayonnaise in Rowan's bed and chili in her breakfast cereal.

At the beginning of the following episode, "Working the Brand", host Jodhi Meares appeared in a message to viewers before the start of the episode explaining that the events of the previous week were examples of natural teenage behavior and the team behind Australia's Next Top Model did not support nor condone the behavior. Reveley apologized to Rowan on camera, but also stated in a confessional that the incident had been "blown out of proportion". Rowan was ultimately eliminated that same episode.

Notes

References

External links
 Official website

2008 Australian television seasons
Australia's Next Top Model seasons
Television shows filmed in Australia
Television shows filmed in Fiji
Television shows filmed in New York City